The Treaty of London of 1839, was signed on 19 April 1839 between the Concert of Europe, the United Kingdom of the Netherlands and the Kingdom of Belgium. It was a direct follow-up to the 1831 Treaty of the XVIII Articles, which the Netherlands had refused to sign, and the result of negotiations at the London Conference of 1838–1839.

Under the treaty, the European powers recognised and guaranteed the independence and neutrality of Belgium and established the full independence of the German-speaking part of Luxembourg. Article VII required Belgium to remain perpetually neutral; Belgium formally abandoned its policy of neutrality after its experiences in both world wars.

Background

Since 1815, Belgium had been a reluctant part of the United Kingdom of the Netherlands. In 1830, Belgians broke away and established an independent Kingdom of Belgium. The overwhelmingly Catholic population could not accept the Dutch king's favouritism toward Protestantism, while French-speakers were irritated by his disdain for the French language, and the middle classes objected to the Dutch monopolisation of public offices. Liberals regarded King William I's rule as despotic, while there were high levels of unemployment and industrial unrest among the working classes.

Small-scale fighting – the death of some 600 volunteers is commemorated in the Place des Martyrs, Brussels – was followed by an international settlement in 1831. However the settlement was not accepted by the Dutch, who invaded the country in the autumn of 1831; and it took a French army recapturing Antwerp in 1832 before Belgium and the Netherlands could even agree an armistice. Several years later, the Netherlands recognised that they stood to gain more territory by accepting the 1831 settlement than from a mere continuance of the armistice. The Belgian government protested, with French support, against the late implementation of the settlement terms, but Britain accepted the Dutch claim; and in 1839, the Dutch accepted Belgian independence (and regained the disputed territories) by the Treaty of London. At the same time, the major powers all guaranteed Belgium's independence from the Netherlands.

Territorial consequences
With the treaty, the southern provinces of the Netherlands, independent de facto since 1830, became internationally recognised as the Kingdom of Belgium, while the Province of Limburg was split into Belgian and Dutch parts.

The Grand Duchy of Luxemburg was in a personal union with the Netherlands and simultaneously a member of the German Confederation. The treaty partitioned the grand duchy. It lost two-thirds of its territory to Belgium's new Province of Luxembourg. The partitioning left a rump grand duchy, covering one-third of the original territory and inhabited by one-half of the original population, in personal union with the Netherlands, under King-Grand Duke William I (and subsequently William II and William III). This arrangement was confirmed by the 1867 Treaty of London, known as the 'Second Treaty of London' in reference to the 1839 treaty, and lasted until the death of King-Grand Duke William III 23 November 1890.

Neutrality of Belgium

Belgium's de facto independence had been established through nine years of intermittent fighting. The co-signatories of the Treaty of London now officially recognised the independent Kingdom of Belgium. The five great powers of Europe (Austria, France, Prussia, Russia, and the United Kingdom) also pledged to guarantee Belgium's neutrality.

The treaty was a fundamental "lawmaking" treaty that became a cornerstone of European international law; it was especially important in the events leading up to World War I.On 31 July 1914 the mobilisation of the Belgian Army was ordered, and the Belgian king at the same time publicly called Europe's attention to the fact that Germany, Great Britain and France were solemnly bound to respect and to defend the neutrality of his country. When the German Empire invaded Belgium in August 1914 in violation of the treaty, after an unanswered ultimatum UK declared war on 4 August. Informed by the British ambassador that Britain would go to war with Germany over the latter's violation of Belgian neutrality, German Chancellor Theobald von Bethmann Hollweg exclaimed that he could not believe that Britain and Germany would be going to war over a mere "scrap of paper".

However, the actual reasoning may have had at least as much to do with the British fright that lack of their help leading to a possible defeat of France could lead to German hegemony in Western Europe, with Christopher Clark pointing out that the British cabinet decided on July 29, 1914, that being a signatory to the 1839 treaty guaranteeing Belgium's frontiers did not obligate it to oppose a German invasion of Belgium with military force. According to Isabel V. Hull:
Annika Mombauer correctly sums up the current historiography: "Few historians would still maintain that the 'rape of Belgium' was the real motive for Britain's declaration of war on Germany." Instead, the role of Belgian neutrality is variously interpreted as an excuse used to mobilise public opinion, to provide embarrassed radicals in the cabinet with the justification for abandoning the principal of pacifism and thus staying in office, or - in the more conspiratorial versions - as cover for naked imperial interests. 
Refer to British entry into World War I for further details.

Iron Rhine

The Treaty of London also guaranteed Belgium the right of transit by rail or canal over Dutch territory as an outlet to the German Ruhr. This right was reaffirmed in a 24 May 2005 ruling of the Permanent Court of Arbitration in a dispute between Belgium and the Netherlands on the railway track.

In 2004 Belgium requested a reopening of the Iron Rhine railway. This was the result of the increasing transport of goods between the port of Antwerp and the German Ruhr Area. As part of the European policy of modal shift on the increasing traffic of goods, transport over railway lines and waterways was now preferred over road transport. The Belgian request was based on the treaty of 1839, and the Iron Rhine Treaty of 1873. After a series of failed negotiations, the Belgian and Dutch governments agreed to take the issue to the Permanent Court of Arbitration and respect its ruling in the case.

In a ruling of 24 May 2005, the court acknowledged both the Belgian rights under the cessation treaty of 1839 and the Dutch concerns for part of the Meinweg National Park nature reserve. The 1839 treaty still applied, the court found, giving Belgium the right to use and modernise the Iron Rhine. However, Belgium would be obliged to finance the modernisation of the line, while the Netherlands had to fund the repairs and maintenance of the route. Both countries were to share the costs of a tunnel beneath the nature reserve.

In media
 The Treaty is mentioned multiple times in The Prisoner episode "The General".
 A Scrap of Paper, comedic short film by Fatty Arbuckle

See also
 List of treaties
 Treaty of Maastricht (1843)
 Treaties of London
 Schlieffen Plan

Footnotes

Further reading
 
 Omond. G. W. T. "The Question of the Netherlands in 1829–1830," Transactions of the Royal Historical Society (1919) pp. 150–171 
 Schroeder, Paul W. The Transformation of European Politics, 1763–1848 (1994) pp. 716–18

Primary sources

External links

 'Belgian Neutrality and its Reinterpretation ahead of the First World War'
 Original text of the Treaty in French and its 1915 English translation

London (1839)
History of Luxembourg (1815–1890)
Belgian Revolution
Causes of World War I
1839 in the Austrian Empire
1839 in France
1839 in the United Kingdom
1839 in Belgium
1839 in Luxembourg
London (1839)
Belgium–Netherlands border
Belgium–Luxembourg border
1839 treaties
London (1839)
London (1839)
London (1839)
Conferences in London
Treaties of the Russian Empire
Treaties of Belgium
1839 in the Netherlands
William I of the Netherlands
April 1839 events
1839 in London